Icing on ships is a serious hazard where cold temperatures (below about ) combined with high wind speed (typically force 8 or above on the Beaufort scale) result in spray blown off the sea freezing immediately on contact with the ship. If not frequently knocked off, the ice can soon build up on the ship's superstructure to a sufficient weight to cause the ship to capsize.

It is typically a problem in Arctic and Antarctic seas, but can also occur in other seas such as the Gulf of Saint Lawrence, the Sea of Japan, the Baltic Sea, and very rarely, the North Sea.

See also
Shipping Forecast

External links
US Army Engineer Research

Nautical terminology